Thor is a comic book superhero in the . Since 1962, he and the Jane Foster incarnation of Thor have starred in several ongoing series, as well as many limited series and specials. All stories are published exclusively by Marvel Comics under their standard imprint, unless otherwise noted.

Primary series
Journey into Mystery #83–125 (August 1962February 1966)
 Journey into Mystery Annual #1 (1965)  
Thor #126–502  (March 1966September 1996)
 Thor Annual #2–19  (1966; 1971; 1976–1979; 1981–1985; 1989–1994)
Thor vol. 2 #1–85 [#503–587] (July 1998October 2004)
 Silver Surfer & Thor Annual '98
 Thor Annual 1999, 2000, 2001
Thor vol. 3 #1–12 [#588–599] (July 2007January 2009)
 Thor Annual #1 (2009)
Thor #600–621 (April 2009March 2011) and Thor 620.1
The Mighty Thor #1–22 [#622–643] (May 2011October 2012) and The Mighty Thor #12.1
 The Mighty Thor Annual #1 (2012)
Thor: God of Thunder #1–25 [#644–668] (November 2012September 2014)
Thor vol. 4 #1–8 [#669–676] (October 2014May 2015, featuring Jane Foster)
 Thor Annual #1 (2015, featuring Jane Foster)
The Mighty Thor vol. 2 #1–23 [#677–699] (November 2015November 2017, featuring Jane Foster)
The Mighty Thor #700–706 (December 2017June 2018, featuring Jane Foster)
Thor vol. 5 #1–16 [#707–722] (August 2018October 2019)
King Thor #1–4 [#723–726] (November 2019February 2020)
Thor vol. 6 #1– [#727– ] (March 2020present)
 Thor Annual #1 (2021)

Secondary series
(issue numbers do not count towards the legacy numbering)
Journey into Mystery vol. 2 #1–19 (October 1972October 1975, does not feature Thor)
Journey into Mystery #503–521 (November 1996June 1998, does not feature Thor)
 Journey into Mystery #−1 (July 1997)
Thor: Son of Asgard #1–12 (March 2004January 2005)
Thor: The Mighty Avenger #1–8 (July 2010January 2011)
Journey into Mystery #622–655 (May 2011August 2013) and Journey into Mystery #626.1

Timeline

Miniseries and one-shots
Marvel Comics Group: Thor (July 2000)
Thor: Godstorm #1–3 (SeptemberNovember 2001)
Thor: Vikings #1–5 (JulyNovember 2003)
Thor: Blood Oath #1–6 (SeptemberDecember 2005)
What If? Thor #1 (February 2006)
Thor: Ages of Thunder (April 2008)
Thor: Reign of Blood (June 2008)
Secret Invasion: Thor #1–3 (AugustOctober 2008)
Thor: The Truth of History #1 (October 2008)
Thor God-Size Special (December 2008)
Thor: Man of War #1 (January 2009)
Thor: The Trial of Thor (June 2009)
Thor Giant-Size Finale (November 2009)
Thor and the Warriors Four #1–4 (AprilJuly 2010)
Thor: The Rage of Thor (August 2010)
Thor: First Thunder #1–5 (September 2010January 2011)
Thor: For Asgard #1–6 (September 2010February 2011)
Thor: Wolves of the North (December 2010)
Captain America/Thor: The Mighty Fighting Avengers (Free Comic Book Day 2011)
Iron Man/Thor #1–4 (JanuaryApril 2011)
Chaos War: Thor #1–2 (JanuaryFebruary 2011)
Astonishing Thor #1–5 (November 2010September 2011)
Thor: Heaven and Earth #1–4 (SeptemberNovember 2011)
Avengers Origins: Thor (January 2012)
Fear Itself: Thor #7.2 (January 2012)
Thor: The Deviants Saga #1–5 (JanuaryMay 2012)
Thor: Season One (December 2013)
Thor: Crown Of Fools (December 2013)
Original Sin: Thor & Loki - The Tenth Realm #5.1–5.5 (SeptemberNovember 2014)
Thors: Battleworld #1–4 (JuneOctober 2015)
The Unworthy Thor #1–5 (November 2016March 2017)
Generations: The Mighty Thor & The Unworthy Thor (October 2017)
Thor vs. Hulk: Champions of the Universe #1–6 (November 2017January 2018)
Thor: Where Walk the Frost Giants (December 2017)
Mighty Thor: At the Gates of Valhalla (July 2018)
War of the Realms #1–6 (June 2019August 2019)
War of the Realms Omega (July 2019)
Marvel's Avengers: Thor (March 2020)
Fortnite X Marvel: Nexus War -  Thor #1 (October 2020)
Thor: Lightning and Lament #1 (June 2022)

Spin-off miniseries and one-shots
Balder the Brave #1–4 (November 1985May 1986)
Thor Corps #1–4 (JulyNovember 1993)
Thunderstrike #1–24 (April 1993July 1995)
Loki #1–4 (SeptemberNovember 2004)
Stormbreaker: The Saga of Beta Ray Bill #1–6 (March 2005August 2005)
Secret Invasion Aftermath: Beta Ray Bill (June 2009)
Beta Ray Bill: Godhunter #1–3 (August 2009October 2009)
Siege: Loki (June 2010)
Sif (June 2010)
Ultimate Comics: Thor #1–4 (October 2010April 2011)
Loki vol. 2 #1–4 (December 2010May 2011)
Thunderstrike vol. 2 #1–5 (JanuaryMay 2011)
Warriors Three #1–4 (JanuaryApril 2011)
Loki: Agent of Asgard #1–17 (April 2014October 2015)
Angela: Asgard's Assassin #1–6 (February 2015July 2015)
1602: Witch Hunter Angela #1–4 (August 2015December 2015)
Angela: Queen of Hel #1–7 (December 2015June 2016)
Vote Loki #1–4 (August 2016November 2016)
Asgardians of the Galaxy  #1-10 (November 2018August 2019)
Loki vol. 3 #1–5 (September 2019January 2020)
Valkyrie: Jane Foster #1–10 (October 2019August 2020)
Annihilation: Scourge - Beta Ray Bill (February 2020)
King in Black: Return of the Valkyries #1–4 (March 2021May 2021)
Mighty Valkyries #1–5 (June 2021November 2021)
Thor & Loki: Double Trouble #1–4 (May 2021September 2021)
Beta Ray Bill #1–5 (May 2021September 2021)

Collected editions

Marvel Masterworks: Thor

Essential Thor

Thor Epic Collections

Omnibus

Thor Volume 1

Thor Volume 2 - Heroes Reborn

Thor Volume 3 - Straczynski and Fraction

Thor by Jason Aaron

Thor Volume 6

See also 

Lists of comic book titles
Lists of comics by character
Lists of comics by Marvel Comics
Thor (Marvel Comics)